The Thunerseespiele are open-air musical productions during summer located at Thun, the main city of the famous Bernese Oberland, in Switzerland.  Every year internationally-famous productions are staged.

The location is at the shoreline of Lake Thun (Thunersee).  The stage is temporarily built every year over the water, especially for this production.  The stage orientation allows the audience to see one of the most famous mountain panoramas with the Eiger, Mönch and Jungfrau mountain peaks rising over Switzerland in the background.  Several eating areas provide an amenable atmosphere to spending summer nights in this area.

Productions
 2003: Evita
 2004: Anatevka
 2005: Miss Saigon
 2006: Elisabeth
 2007: Les Misérables
 2008: West Side Story
 2009: Jesus Christ Superstar
 2010: Dällebach Kari
 2011: Gotthelf (based on Die Käserei in der Vehfreude) 
 2012: Titanic
 2013: Der Besuch der alten Dame (based on The Visit)
 2014: Aida
 2015: Romeo und Julia
 2016: Sugar 
 2017: Cats
 2018: Mamma Mia
 2019: Ich war noch niemals in New York
 2022: Io Senza Te

External links
 Thunerseespiele website

Swiss culture
Festivals in Switzerland
Summer events in Switzerland